François Bergeron (born 1964) is a Canadian sound designer and co-founder of Thinkwell Group and was the former sound engineer for Cirque du Soleil for more than twenty years.

Early life 
Bergeron was born in Canada in 1964 and has completed his education from Séminaire de St-Hyacinthe (today Collège Antoine-Girouard). In 1989, he left the Quebec theatre world and joined Cirque du Soleil.

Career 
Awarded “Sound Designer of the Year” by Entertainment Design magazine in 1996, Bergeron has been part of multiple award-winning projects with Cirque du Soleil, The Walt Disney Company, Universal Studios, and Thinkwell Group. He has designed sound for Walt Disney and notable shows like Bad Hair Day (film) and La Nouba.

Cirque du Soleil 
Prior to and since the founding of Thinkwell, Bergeron had been working for Cirque du Soleil for 20+ years, serving as Sound Designer for various productions. He continued to assist the company in creating new aural experiences for Cirque's productions around the Globe for years following. His experience across numerous award-winning productions included "O" (Las Vegas) (3), "Zed" (Tokyo)(4), "La Nouba" (Orlando), Varekai (Touring)(5) and many others.

Thinkwell Group 
Bergeron co-founded Thinkwell Group in 2001 and continues to lead the company as Chief Operations Officer and Chief Financial Officer alongside Joe Zenas, chief executive officer, and Craig Hanna, Chief Creative Officer.

References 

1964 births
Living people
Canadian sound designers